Tom Lemaire (born 26 July 1960) is a Belgian diver. He competed at the 1984 Summer Olympics and the 1988 Summer Olympics.

References

External links
 

1960 births
Living people
Belgian male divers
Olympic divers of Belgium
Divers at the 1984 Summer Olympics
Divers at the 1988 Summer Olympics
Sportspeople from Bujumbura
20th-century Belgian people